The Greenwood Micropolitan Statistical Area is a micropolitan area in the northwestern Delta region of Mississippi that covers two counties - Leflore and Carroll. As of the 2000 census, the USA had a population of 48,716 (though a July 1, 2009 estimate placed the population at 44,841).

Counties
Carroll
Leflore

Communities

Cities
Greenwood (Principal City)
Itta Bena

Towns
Carrollton
Morgan City
North Carrollton
Schlater
Sidon
Vaiden

Unincorporated places
Avalon
Black Hawk
Coila
McCarley
Minter City
Money
Swiftown
Teoc, Mississippi

Demographics
As of the census of 2000, there were 48,716 people, 17,027 households, and 11,956 families residing within the μSA. The racial makeup of the μSA was 37.22% White, 60.85% African American, 0.10% Native American, 0.54% Asian, 0.03% Pacific Islander, 0.79% from other races, and 0.47% from two or more races. Hispanic or Latino of any race were 1.64% of the population.

The median income for a household in the μSA was $25,198, and the median income for a family was $30,885. Males had a median income of $27,209 versus $19,096 for females. The per capita income for the μSA was $14,149.

See also
List of metropolitan areas in Mississippi
List of micropolitan areas in Mississippi
List of cities in Mississippi
List of towns and villages in Mississippi
List of census-designated places in Mississippi
List of United States metropolitan areas

References

 
Geography of Carroll County, Mississippi
Geography of Leflore County, Mississippi